A frivolous party or a joke party is a political party which has been created for the purposes of entertainment or political satire. Such a party may or may not have a serious point behind its activities. This is a list of frivolous political parties.

Some more serious political parties, such as the Rent Is Too Damn High Party, may use the same tactics and humorous approaches to politics as their more frivolous counterparts but aim to address legitimate sociopolitical issues, something that frivolous parties do not do.

Australia
 Deadly Serious Party (deregistered in 1988)
 Imperial British Conservative Party (see also: Cecil G. Murgatroyd, defunct)
 Party! Party! Party! (defunct)
 Sun Ripened Warm Tomato Party (defunct)

Austria
Ridge Party
The Beer Party

Austria-Hungary, Czechoslovakia
 The Party of Moderate Progress Within the Bounds of the Law (Jaroslav Hašek, 1911)

Belarus
Beer Lovers Party (defunct in 1998)

Canada
 Canadian Extreme Wrestling Party (defunct)
 Parti Citron (Lemon Party, defunct)
 Rhinoceros Party
 Parti éléphant blanc de Montréal (defunct)
 The Canada Party

Czech Republic
Friends of Beer Party (1990–1998)
ANO, vytrollíme europarlament – Yes, We Will Troll the Euro-Parliament (2019)

Denmark
 Union of Conscientiously Work-Shy Elements (defunct)

Estonia
 Royalist Party of Estonia (defunct)

Faroe Islands
 Hin Stuttligi Flokkurin (The Funny Party, defunct)

Germany
 APPD (Anarchist Pogo Party of Germany)
 Die PARTEI ('The Party'; Party for Labour, Rule of Law, Protection of Animals, Promotion of Elites and Grassroot-Democratic Initiative) (represented in the European Parliament)
 Front Deutscher Äpfel

Hong Kong
National Opposition Party (2012)
Conditioning Farming Orchid Line (2013)
Hong Kong Neutral Party (2016)
Hong Kong Communist Party (2018)

 2015 political reform controversy, a large number of political groups used a lot of colloquial names to participate in public hearings in Hong Kong Legislative Council in the name of the group, put forward opinions on the political reform plan.

Don't Care CY Leung Youth Army
You love Hong Kong or China more group
I don't care 
Revealed the fake universal election over counterfeit bills union
Adjust and manage the Agricultural Service Department Political Reform Alliance
I am righteous world needs me I want true universal suffrage yoyo major league
Hehe Fan League of Love and True Universal Suffrage
What what what union
My mom is not kind union
(laughs) I want true universal election (Monkey Face) 
Undaunted by the changing world, the Coalition for Universal Suffrage
Kind Mother 689 Army General Association
I love true universal suffrage hahahahahahahahahahahahahahahahahahahahahahahahahahahahahahahahahahahahahahahahahahahahahahahahahahahahahahahahahahahahahahahahahaha
Prince Cup Yeh Guards demand true universal election for rations
Lee See-yin true goddess I wants true universal election guards
Uncle Zhenying, the star of disaster in Hong Kong, returned to the countryside to plough the fields to support the team in the night of Ye Yiye 
Student Zuoxing left foot cramps become left glue syndrome, pay attention to the Youth Federation and the Federation of Industry for Recruiting You Belt Buckles Foot cramps become left glue syndrome, follow the Youth Federation )
Hong Kong Remove Traitor Alliance

Other political groups have tried to participate in the Legislative Council meeting in the name of an organization, but the Legislative Council Secretariat refused to register on the grounds that "the name is not respectful".  A similar situation also appeared at public hearings in 2016 Anti-Northeast New Territories Funding Demonstration, involving political groups including:

China Border Watch Association
Conditioning Farming Orchid Lines 
Legco2 League
Hong Kong Expose Liar Alliance
CY Leung ruined Hong Kong Association

Hungary
 Hungarian Two Tailed Dog Party

Iceland
 Best Party (defunct)

Iran
 Party of Donkeys (defunct)

Italy
 Love Party (Partito dell'Amore) (defunct)
 Italian Nettist Party (Partito Nettista Italiano) (defunct)
 Party of Creative Madness (Partito della follia creativa)

Japan
 No Party to Support
 The Party to Protect the People from NHK

Kosovo 

 Strong Party (Partia e Fortë) (defunct)

New Zealand
Bill and Ben Party (defunct)
Imperial British Conservative Party (defunct)
McGillicuddy Serious Party (defunct)
The Civilian Party (defunct)

Netherlands
Party of the Future (defunct)
The Party Party (defunct)
Provo (defunct)
Rapaille Partij (defunct)

Norway
 Beer Unity Party (defunct)
 The Political Party (defunct)

Poland
 Good Humor Party
 Polish Beer-Lovers' Party (defunct after winning 16 seats in 1991)

Romania
 Partidul Liber-Schimbist (defunct)

Russia 

 Beer Lovers Party (defunct)
 Party of the Dead

Serbia 
 Sarmu probo nisi: (Ljubiša Preletačević, the leader of SPN, participated in the 2017 Serbian presidential election and he came third with 9.44% of the vote)

Spain
 Coordinadora Reusenca Independent
 Partido del Karma Democrático, PKD ("Party of the Democratic Karma")

Sweden
 Donald Duck Party

Taiwan
  (defunct)

United Kingdom
 Adam Lyal's Witchery Tour Party (defunct)
 Church of the Militant Elvis Party, also known as the Bus Pass Elvis Party (defunct) 
 The Eccentric Party of Great Britain
 Fancy Dress Party (defunct)
 Mercian Nationalist Party
 New Millennium Bean Party
 Official Monster Raving Loony Party
 Raving Loony Green Giant Party (defunct)
 Rock 'n' Roll Loony Party (defunct)
 Teddy Bear Alliance (defunct)

United States
 Guns and Dope Party
 OWL Party
 Straight Talking American Government Party (STAG) (defunct)
 Surprise Party
 Undecided Cow Party
 Birthday Party
 Youth International Party
 Legoland Party
 The St. Augustine Tea Party

See also

Lists of political parties
List of fictional political parties
List of practical joke topics
Non-human electoral candidates
Jedi census phenomenon

Notes

References

Adrian Room, Brewer's Dictionary of Modern Phrase & Fable, 

Political parties
Frivolous